Zakany is a surname. Notable people with the surname include:

Bertalan Zakany (born 1984), Hungarian figure skater
Sandro Zakany (born 1987), Austrian footballer